Łapczyna Wola  is a village in the administrative district of Gmina Kluczewsko, within Włoszczowa County, Świętokrzyskie Voivodeship, in south-central Poland.

Calvinist church 
In 1704 existed in Łapczyna Wola, the Calvinist church. In 1730, the minister of the church was Samuel Aram. In 1754, the church was closed.

References

Villages in Włoszczowa County